Major General Euston Henry Sartorius  (6 June 1844 – 19 February 1925) was a recipient of the Victoria Cross (VC), the highest and most prestigious award for gallantry in the face of the enemy that can be awarded to British and Commonwealth forces. His brother Reginald was also awarded the VC.

Life
Sartorius was educated at Victoria College, Jersey, then the Royal Naval School, New Cross. He then decided on an army career and attended the Royal Military Academy, Woolwich, followed by the Royal Military College, Sandhurst. In 1862 he joined the 59th (2nd Nottinghamshire) Regiment of Foot as an ensign. In June 1869 at Broadstairs he rescued three girls from drowning, for which he received the Bronze Medal of the Royal Humane Society. 

In the 1870s, he spent four years as military surveying instructor at Sandhurst, and then travelled for a year overland, via Persia, to India to rejoin his regiment. When the Second Anglo-Afghan War (1878–80) broke out, the 59th Foot formed part of the southern Afghanistan Field Force, serving in and around Kandahar. In October 1879 Sartorius was part of a British advance upon a large Ghilzais force assembling at Shahjui. Under fire from British artillery, the Ghilzais retreated, taking refuge in an old hill-top fort. Sartorius won his VC for leading a small force that captured this fort.

VC action
Sartorius was a 35 year old captain in the 59th (2nd Nottinghamshire) Regiment of Foot (later The East Lancashire Regiment), British Army, during the Second Anglo-Afghan War when the following deed took place on 24 October 1879 at Shahjui, Afghanistan for which he was awarded the VC:

For his Afghan service, he was also made brevet major, and twice mentioned in dispatches.

Later career
Due to wounds received during his VC action, Sartorius partially lost the use of his left hand. Unable to continue as an active field officer, he was appointed to a staff post at Aldershot. In the 1882 Anglo-Egyptian War he was made deputy assistant adjutant-general and quartermaster-general, responsible for base and communications. For this, he was made brevet lieutenant-colonel, mentioned in dispatches, and received the fourth-class Order of Osmanieh. He became a colonel in 1886, and was assistant adjutant-general in Portsmouth from 1891 to 1894. In 1896 he was made a companion of the Order of the Bath, and went to Japan as military attaché. After promotion to Major-general in 1899, he retired in August 1901 but continued as colonel of a volunteer battalion of the South Lancashire Regiment.

In retirement he lived at Holmbury St Mary, Surrey, and in London. Following a short illness he died at his residence in Chelsea, London, on 19 February 1925. He was buried at St Peter and St Paul's Churchyard, Ewhurst, Surrey.

Family
His father was Admiral of the Fleet Sir George Rose Sartorius. He had two elder brothers, both of whom also entered the army: George Conrad Sartorius, who retired as a colonel, and Major General Reginald William Sartorius, who was also awarded the VC. One of Victoria College Jersey's five Houses was later named 'Sartorius' after the three brothers, all of whom attended the school.

He succeeded his father as Count of Penhafirme in the Portuguese nobility, and was confirmed in the title by King Carlos I on 20 June 1903. On 22 December 1874 he married Emily Jane, daughter of Sir Francis Cook, 1st Viscount of Monserrate; their son Euston Francis Frederick Sartorius was born in 1882 and served in the Grenadier Guards.

The medal
His Victoria Cross is held by the National Army Museum, Chelsea, London.

References

Monuments to Courage (David Harvey, 1999)
The Register of the Victoria Cross (This England, 1997)

External links
Location of grave and VC medal (Surrey)

1844 births
1925 deaths
Burials in Surrey
British military attachés
British recipients of the Victoria Cross
British Army generals
Companions of the Order of the Bath
People educated at Victoria College, Jersey
Victoria Cross recipients from Jersey
East Lancashire Regiment officers
59th Regiment of Foot officers
Second Anglo-Afghan War recipients of the Victoria Cross
British Army personnel of the Anglo-Egyptian War
British Army recipients of the Victoria Cross
Counts of Portugal